Enrico is both an Italian masculine given name and a surname, Enrico means homeowner, or king, derived from Heinrich of Germanic origin. It is also a given name in Ladino. Equivalents in other languages are Henry (English), Henri (French), Enrique (Spanish), Henrique (Portuguese) and Hendrik (Dutch). Notable people with the name include:

Given name
 Enrico Albertosi (born 1939), Italian former football goalkeeper
 Enrico Alfonso (born 1988), Italian football player
 Enrico Alvino (1808–1872), Italian architect and urban designer
 Enrico Annoni (born 1966), retired Italian professional footballer
 Enrico Arrigoni (1894–1986), Italian individualist anarchist
 Enrico Baj (1924–2003), Italian artist and art writer
 Enrico Banducci (1922–2007), American impresario
 Enrico Barone (1859–1924), Italian economist
 Enrico Berlinguer (1923–1984), Italian politician
 Enrico Bertaggia (born 1964), Italian former racing driver
 Enrico Betti (1823–1892), Italian mathematician
 Enrico Blasi (born 1972), Canadian hockey coach
 Enrico Bombieri (born 1940), Italian mathematician
 Enrico Boselli (born 1957), Italian politician
 Enrico Brizzi (born 1974), Italian writer
 Enrico Cardoso Nazaré (born 1984), Brazilian football player
 Enrico Caruso (1873–1921), Italian opera singer
 Enrico Castelnuovo (1839–1915), Italian writer
 Enrico Caterino Davila (1576–1631), Italian historian
 Enrico Caviglia (1862–1945), distinguished officer in the Italian army
 Enrico Cecchetti (1850–1928), Italian ballet dancer
 Enrico Celio (1889–1980), Swiss politician
 Enrico Chiesa (born 1970), Italian football striker
 Enrico Cialdini (1811–1892), Italian soldier, politician and diplomat
 Enrico Ciccone (born 1970), retired Canadian ice hockey defenceman
 Enrico Clementi (1931–2021), Italian pioneer in computational techniques for quantum chemistry and molecular dynamics
 Enrico Cocozza (1921–1997), Scottish filmmaker
 Enrico Colantoni (born 1963), Canadian actor
 Enrico Corradini (1865–1931), Italian novelist, essayist, journalist, and nationalist political figure
 Enrico Cosenz (1820–1898), Italian soldier
 Enrico Cuccia (1907-2000), Italian banker
 Enrico Dandolo (c. 1107–1205), Doge of the city-state of Venice
 Enrico Dante (1884–1967), Italian prelate of the Roman Catholic Church
 Enrico David (born 1966), Italian artist
 Enrico De Angelis (1920–2018), Italian singer
 Enrico de Lorenzo (20th century), Italian bobsledder
 Enrico De Nicola (1877–1959), Italian jurist, journalist, and politician
 Enrico Degano (born 1976), Italian professional road bicycle racer
 Enrico degli Scrovegni (14th century), Paduan nobleman
 Enrico Di Giuseppe (1932–2005), American operatic tenor
 Enrico Donati (1909–2008), American surrealist painter and sculptor
 Enrico Echiverri (born 1954), Filipino politician
 Enrico Fabris (born 1981), Italian long track speed skater
 Enrico Fantini (born 1976), Italian footballer
 Enrico Fazzini (21st century), neurologist
 Enrico Fermi (1901–1954), Italian-American physicist
 Enrico Ferri (1856–1929), Italian criminologist and socialist
 Enrico Forlanini (1848–1930), Italian engineer, inventor and aeronautical pioneer
 Enrico Franzoi (born 1982), Italian professional cyclo-cross and road bicycle racer
 Enrico Gamba (1831–1883), Italian artist
 Enrico Garbuglia (1900–2007), Italian centenarian
 Enrico Gasparotto (born 1982), Italian professional road racing cyclist
 Enrico Gasparri (1871–1946), Roman Catholic Cardinal and Archbishop
 Enrico Gatti (born 1955), Italian classical violinist
 Enrico Gentile (20th century), Italian singer
 Enrico Gilardi (born 1957), Italian former basketball player
 Enrico Giovannini (born 1957), Italian economist and statistician
 Enrico Guicciardi (1812-1895), Italian colonel and senator
 Enrico Haffner (1640–1702), Italian painter
 Enrico Hillyer Giglioli (1845–1909), Italian zoologist and anthropologist
 Enrico Kern (born 1979), German football player
 Enrico Komning (born 1968), German politician
 Enrico Kühn (born 1977), German bobsledder
 Enrico Letta (born 1966), Italian politician
 Enrico La Loggia (born 1947), Italian politician
 Enrico Lo Verso (born 1964), Italian actor
 Enrico Lorenzetti (1911–1989), Italian professional Grand Prix motorcycle road racer
 Enrico Macias (born 1938), Algerian-born French Jewish singer
 Enrico Mainardi (1897–1976), Italian cellist, composer, and conductor
 Enrico Marconi (1792–1863), Italian-born architect
 Enrico Maria Salerno (1926–1994), Italian theatre and film actor
 Enrico Marini (born 1969), Swiss comic artist
 Enrico Mattei (1906–1962), Italian public administrator
 Enrico Minutoli (died 1412), Italian Cardinal
 Enrico Mizzi (1885–1950), Maltese politician
Enrico Morin (1841–1910), Italian admiral and politician
 Enrico Nardi (1907–1966), Italian racing car driver, engineer and designer
Enrico Nascimbeni (1959–2019), Italian singer, journalist and poet
Enrico Nigiotti (born 1987), Italian singer-songwriter
Enrico Nizzi (born 1990), Italian cross-country skier
 Enrico Pace (born 1967), Italian pianist
 Enrico Paoli (1908–2005), Italian chess master
 Enrico Pedrini (1940–2012), Italian theorist and collector of conceptual art
 Enrico Perucconi (1925–2020), Italian athlete
 Enrico Pieranunzi (born 1949), Italian jazz pianist
 Enrico Platé (1909–1954), Italian motor racing driver and team manager
 Enrico Poitschke (born 1969), German road racing cyclist
 Enrico Rastelli (1896–1931), Italian juggler, acrobat and performer
 Enrico Rava (born 1939), Italian avant-garde jazz musician
 Enrico Rocca (1847–1915), Italian violin maker
 Enrico Rosenbaum (1944–1979), American songwriter, arranger, producer, guitarist and singer
 Enrico Ruggeri (born 1957), Italian singer-songwriter
 Enrico Sabbatini (1932–1998), Italian-born costume designer and production designer
 Enrico Sertoli (1842–1910), Italian physiologist and histologist
 Enrico Sgrulletti (born 1965), Italian hammer thrower
 Enrico Sibilia (1861–1948), Italian Roman Catholic Cardinal
 Enrico Stefani (20th century), Italian architect and archaeologist
 Enrico Tameleo (died 1985), Italian-American mobster
 Enrico Teodorani (born 1970), Italian comic book creator, creator of Djustine
 Enrico Toccacelo (born 1978), Italian auto racer
 Enrico Toselli (1883–1926), Italian pianist and composer
 Enrico Toti (1882–1916), Italian patriot and hero of World War I
 Enrico Valtorta (1883–1951), Italian-born first Roman Catholic bishop of Hong Kong
 Enrico Verson (1845–1927), Italian entomologist
 Enrico Viarisio (1897–1979), Italian theatre and cinema actor
 Enrico Villanueva (born 1980), Filipino professional basketball player
 Enrico Wijngaarde (born 1974), Surinamese football referee
 Enrico Zuccalli (c. 1640–1724), Swiss architect

Mid name 
 Marco Enrico Bossi (1861–1925), Italian organist and composer

Surname 
 Robert Enrico (1931–2001), French film director and scriptwriter

Fictional characters 
 Enrico Marini (Resident Evil), a fictional character from the Resident Evil video game series
 Enrico Maxwell, a character from the manga and anime series Hellsing
 Enrico Pollini, a character played by Rowan Atkinson from the film Rat Race
 Enrico Pucci (JoJo's Bizarre Adventure), a fictional character from the Japanese manga JoJo's Bizarre Adventure

See also
 Enrico IV, a play
 Enrico, opera by Manfred Trojahn  
Enrico, a junior synonym of the spider genus Eucteniza 
 Enrico Biscotti Company, a Pittsburgh bakery
 Errico
 Henry (disambiguation)

Italian masculine given names
Ladino masculine given names
Jewish given names